Saleem Haddad (born 1983) is an author, filmmaker and aid worker of Iraqi-German and Palestinian-Lebanese descent, whose debut novel Guapa was published in 2016.

Early life 
Saleem Haddad was born in Kuwait City in 1983 to a Lebanese-Palestinian father and an Iraqi-German mother. Haddad was subsequently raised and  educated in Jordan, Canada, and the United Kingdom.

Books 
Haddad's debut novel Guapa was released in March 2016 by Other Press. The book, set over 24 hours, tells the story of Rasa, a gay man living in an unnamed Arab country, and trying to carve out a life for himself in the midst of political and religious upheaval.

The novel was excerpted by VICE, and received widespread acclaim, with The New Yorker calling it a "vibrant, wrenching début novel". According to Book Riot, "Haddad maps postcolonial theory, post-revolutionary malaise, and post-outing upheaval onto your standard post-college, what-am-I-doing-with-my-life aimlessness, creating something wonderful and fascinating in the process."

As part of the London Literature Festival, Haddad was awarded the Polari First Book Prize 2017. The prize is awarded annually to a writer whose first book explores the LGBT experience, whether in poetry, prose, fiction or non-fiction.

Other work 
Haddad's work has also appeared in Slate and Muftah. He has also worked as an aid worker with Doctors Without Borders and other organizations in Yemen, Syria, and Iraq. He currently lives in Lisbon with his partner.

In 2018 Haddad wrote and directed his first short film, Marco. The film had its World Premiere at Mawjoudin Queer Film Festival in Tunis, and its European Premiere at BFI Flare: London LGBT Film Festival in London, both in March 2019. The film subsequently screened internationally at festivals including Palm Springs International ShortFest and Outfest Fusion, and was nominated for Best British Short at the 2019 Iris Prize. In April 2020, the film was made available on YouTube.

References

External links 

Marco on YouTube

1983 births
Living people
Kuwaiti novelists
Kuwaiti people of German descent
Kuwaiti people of Iraqi descent
Kuwaiti people of Lebanese descent
Kuwaiti people of Palestinian descent
Kuwaiti emigrants to the United Kingdom
British gay writers
British male novelists
English people of German descent
English people of Iraqi descent
English people of Lebanese descent
English people of Palestinian descent
21st-century British novelists
English LGBT writers
Writers from London
LGBT Muslims
21st-century English male writers